The 2021 Minor League Cricket season (branded as the 2021 Toyota Minor League Cricket championship presented by Sling TV for sponsorship reasons and sometimes shortened to 2021 MiLC) was the inaugural season of Minor League Cricket,  established by USA Cricket (USAC) and Major League Cricket (MLC) in 2019. The season was hosted over 27 venues across the United States, with matches broadcast through Willow and Sling TV. It was played from July 31 to October 3, 2021.

The tournament was won by the Silicon Valley Strikers, who defeated the New Jersey Stallions in the final played in Morrisville, North Carolina by 6 wickets, with Hammad Azam of the Golden State Grizzlies winning the award for Most Valuable Player of the series.

Venues 

  - Western Division (Pacific Conference)
  - Central Division (Pacific Conference)
  - Eastern Division (Atlantic Conference)
  - Southern Division (Atlantic Conference)

Teams

Squads 
Each team released their squad on June 10, 2021.

Results

Atlantic Conference

Pacific Conference

League stage 
The league stage ran from July 31, 2021, to September 19, 2021. The schedule and the venues of the playoffs was released on 20 September 2021 by Major League Cricket.

The season had a total prize pool of $250,000, in which the winner took home $125,000.

Atlantic Conference

Southern Division 

 Top two teams advance to the Quarterfinals
  advances to Quarterfinals to play 2nd-place Eastern Division team
  advances to Quarterfinals to play 1st-place Eastern Division team

Eastern Division 

 Top two teams advance to the Quarterfinals
  advances to Quarterfinals to play 2nd-place Southern Division team
  advances to Quarterfinals to play 1st-place Southern Division team

Pacific Conference

Central Division 

 Top two teams advance to the Quarterfinals
  advances to Quarterfinals to play 2nd-place Western Division team
  advances to Quarterfinals to play 1st-place Western Division team

Western Division 

 Top two teams advance to the Quarterfinals
  advances to Quarterfinals to play 2nd-place Central Division team
  advances to Quarterfinals to play 1st-place Central Division team

Playoffs

Quarter-finals

Semi-finals

Final

Statistics

Most runs

Most wickets

References  

Cricket in the United States
Youth cricket in the United States
American domestic cricket competitions
Twenty20 cricket matches